Contrastive focus reduplication, also called contrastive reduplication, identical constituent compounding, lexical cloning, or the double construction, is a type of syntactic reduplication found in some languages. Doubling a word or phrase – such as "do you like-like him?" – can indicate that the prototypical meaning of the repeated word or phrase is intended.

"As a rough approximation, we can say that the reduplicated modifier singles out a member or subset of the extension of the noun that represents a true, real, default, or prototype instance."

In English, the first part of the reduplicant bears contrastive intonational stress.

Contrastive focus reduplication in English can apply not only to words but also to multi-word phrases such as idioms, or to word stems without their inflectional morphemes.

 I talked to him that week, but I didn't talk to him talk to him.
 In fact I barely talked to him. Not talk talked.

Terminology 
Contrastive focus reduplication has been called by various names in English. Early work on the construction referred to it as double or lexical cloning due to its superficial characteristics.

Theoretical differences in the approach to the construction result in different nomenclatures, as there are theoretical assumptions which underlie any expression. For example, reduplication is often thought of as a morphophonological process, whereas compounding is often regarded as a morphosyntactic process.

American writer Paul Dickson coined the term word word in 1982 to describe this phenomenon.

Structure 
Contrastive focus reduplication features two identical – or near-identical – constituents; these constituents can be words, idioms, or phrases. In English, the left constituent bears contrastive stress, and the right-constituent bears the weight of inflectional morphology.

In English 
Contrastive focus reduplication is a form of motivated redundancy. It is primarily employed as a form of repair in order to reinforce a speaker's true intended meaning.

Examples 
The authors of the article that defined contrastive focus reduplication collected a corpus of examples in English. These include:
 "I'll make the tuna salad and you make the salad salad."
 "How do they know it's turkey bacon and not bacon bacon?"
 "I'm up, I'm just not up up."
"Is that carrot cheesecake or carrot cake-cake?"

In Canadian English, French French means French as spoken in France, as opposed to Canadian French. This can be analyzed either as contrastive focus reduplication, or simply as the noun French (the French language) preceded by the adjective French (from France).

In other languages 
This construction has been identified in German, though research suggests that the meaning of the construction is not readily understood by all speakers.

A typical phrase in Germany is "Er ist mein Freund, aber nicht mein Freund Freund". This is translated to "He's my friend, but not my friend friend [boyfriend]". It's used to disambiguate because there is no word specifically meaning 'boyfriend'.

This linguistic phenomenon is present in Assyrian Neo-Aramaic, particularly among speakers raised among English-speakers. A phrasal example in the language will be; "qartela, ina lela qarta-qarta" (which translates to, "it's cold, but it's not cold-cold").

See also 
 Retronym
 Compound (linguistics)
 Epizeuxis

Notes

References 
 Bross, Fabian & Fraser, Katherine (2020). Contrastive focus reduplication and the modification puzzle. Glossa. A Journal of General Linguistics, 5(1), 47.
 Dray, Nancy. (1987). Doubles and modifiers in English. (Unpublished M.A. thesis, University of Chicago).
 Ghomeshi, Jila, Ray Jackendoff, Nicole Rosen & Kevin Russell (2004). Contrastive focus reduplication in English (the salad-salad paper). Natural Language & Linguistic Theory, 22. 307–357.
 Wierzbicka, Anna. (1991). Cross-cultural pragmatics: The semantics of human interaction. Berlin: Mouton de Gruyter.

Reduplication
Sociolinguistics